The 2015 Asian Men's Club Volleyball Championship was the 16th staging of the AVC Club Championships. The tournament was held in Taipei, Taiwan from 13 to 21 August 2015. The champions qualified for the 2016 FIVB Volleyball Men's Club World Championship as Asia's representative.

Pools composition 
Teams were seeded in the first two positions of each pool following the serpentine system according to their final standing of the 2014 edition. AVC reserved the right to seed the hosts as head of pool A regardless of the final standing of the 2014 edition. All teams not seeded were drawn. Final standing of the 2014 edition are shown in brackets except the hosts who ranked 5th.

Venues
 University of Taipei Gymnasium, Taipei, Taiwan – Pool A, B, E, F and Final eight
 Taipei Gymnasium, Taipei, Taiwan – Pool C, D, G, H, 13th–16th places and 9th–12th places

Pool standing procedure
 Number of matches won
 Match points
 Sets ratio
 Points ratio
 Result of the last match between the tied teams

Match won 3–0 or 3–1: 3 match points for the winner, 0 match points for the loser
Match won 3–2: 2 match points for the winner, 1 match point for the loser

Preliminary round
All times are Taiwan National Standard Time (UTC+08:00).

Pool A

|}

|}

Pool B

|}

|}

Pool C

|}

|}

Pool D

|}

|}

Classification round
All times are Taiwan National Standard Time (UTC+08:00).
The results and the points of the matches between the same teams that were already played during the preliminary round shall be taken into account for the classification round.

Pool E

|}

|}

Pool F

|}

|}

Pool G

|}

|}

Pool H

|}

|}

Final round
All times are Taiwan National Standard Time (UTC+08:00).

13th–16th places

13th–16th semifinals

|}

15th place match

|}

13th place match

|}

9th–12th places

9th–12th semifinals

|}

11th place match

|}

9th place match

|}

Final eight

Quarterfinals

|}

5th–8th semifinals

|}

Semifinals

|}

7th place match

|}

5th place match

|}

3rd place match

|}

Final

|}

Final standing

Awards

Most Valuable Player
  Huang Pei-Hung (Taichung Bank)
Best Setter
  Huang Pei-Hung (Taichung Bank)
Best Outside Spikers
  Chen Chien-Chen (Taichung Bank)
  Liu Hung-Min (Taichung Bank)

Best Middle Blockers
  Ibrahim Ibrahim (Al Arabi)
  Saeid Mostafavand (Paykan Tehran)
Best Opposite Spiker
  Osmel Camejo (Al Arabi)
Best Libero
  Lin Yung-Shun (Taichung Bank)

See also
 List of sporting events in Taiwan

External links
Official website
Regulations
Squads

2015 Asian Men's Club Volleyball Championship
Asian Men's Club Volleyball Championship
Asian Men's Club Volleyball Championship
International volleyball competitions hosted by Taiwan